Mathilde Rose Thérèse Gabriel-Péri (7 June 1902 – 16 December 1981) was a French politician. She was elected to the National Assembly in 1945 as one of the first group of French women in parliament. She served in the National Assembly until 1958.

Biography
Gabriel-Péri was born Mathilde Rose Thérèse Taurinya in Canet-en-Roussillon in 1902. Her sister Pauline married André Marty, a leading communist. She married Gabriel Péri, also a communist activist, in 1927. Although he was imprisoned two years later, he was elected to parliament in 1931 and re-elected in 1936. After the Nazi occupation of France, Gabriel-Péri was interred at Rieucros Camp; her husband was executed the following year.

Following the liberation of France, Gabriel-Péri was appointed to the Provisional Consultative Assembly in 1944. She was subsequently a French Communist Party (PCF) candidate in Seine-et-Oise department in the 1945 National Assembly elections. The first-placed candidate on the PCF list, she was elected to parliament, becoming one of the first group of women in the National Assembly. After being elected she became a member of the Civil and Military Pensions and Victims of War and Repression Commission and the Supply Commission. She was re-elected in the July 1946 elections, and was appointed as a High Court juror in July. Re-elected again in the November 1946 elections, she was made a titular judge in March 1947. She was re-elected in 1951 and 1956, serving in parliament until losing her seat in the 1958 elections.

Gabriel-Péri subsequently retired from politics and died in the Boulogne-Billancourt area of Paris in 1981.

References

1902 births
Politicians from Le Havre
French Resistance members
French Communist Party politicians
Deputies of the 1st National Assembly of the French Fourth Republic
Deputies of the 2nd National Assembly of the French Fourth Republic
Deputies of the 3rd National Assembly of the French Fourth Republic
Women members of the National Assembly (France)
1981 deaths
20th-century French women politicians